The 1961 Sacramento State Hornets football team represented Sacramento State College—now known as California State University, Sacramento—as a member of the Far Western Conference (FWC) during the 1961 NCAA College Division football season. Led by first-year head coach Ray Clemons, Sacramento State compiled an overall record of 4–5 with a mark of 2–3 in conference play, tying for fourth place in the FWC. For the season the team outscored its opponents 117 to 106. The Hornets played home games at Charles C. Hughes Stadium in Sacramento, California.

Schedule

References

Sacramento State
Sacramento State Hornets football seasons
Sacramento State Hornets football